Fred Mann (25 October 1878 – 22 February 1970) was an Australian rules footballer who played with Essendon in the Victorian Football League (VFL).

Mann, recruited from Leopold but born in England, played his first VFL game in 1901. In his first season, he was a member of Essendon's premiership team and played in their Grand Final loss a year later, in 1902.

A defender, he spent the rest of the decade in the West Australian Football League, first at East Fremantle for a season in 1904 and then at South Fremantle for a longer stint which saw him play 77 games.

Ken Mann, his grandson, as well as Peter Mann, his great-grandson, played in the VFL/AFL.

References

1878 births
1970 deaths
Essendon Football Club players
Essendon Football Club Premiership players
East Fremantle Football Club players
South Fremantle Football Club players
Leopold Football Club (MJFA) players
Australian rules footballers from Victoria (Australia)
VFL/AFL players born in England
One-time VFL/AFL Premiership players